Halticotoma is a genus of plant bugs in the family Miridae. There are about six described species in Halticotoma.

Species
These six species belong to the genus Halticotoma:
 Halticotoma andrei Knight, 1968
 Halticotoma brunnea Knight, 1968
 Halticotoma cornifer Knight, 1928
 Halticotoma cornifera Knight, 1928
 Halticotoma nicholi Knight, 1928
 Halticotoma valida Townsend, 1892 (yucca plant bug)

References

Further reading

External links

 

Miridae genera
Articles created by Qbugbot
Eccritotarsini